This is a list of female rock singers. For female heavy metal singers, see List of female heavy metal singers.

A

 Lee Aaron
 Pearl Aday
 Sharon den Adel (Within Temptation)
 Sade Adu
 Nanase Aikawa
 Agent M (Tsunami Bomb)
 Dot Allison
 Zayra Alvarez
 Amber
 Tori Amos
 Vanessa Amorosi
 Christina Amphlett (Divinyls)
 Diana Anaid
 Emma Anderson (Lush)
 Brett Anderson (The Donnas)
 Laurie Anderson
 Signe Toly Anderson (Jefferson Airplane)
 Anouk
 Sarah Anthony (The Letter Black)
 Fiona Apple
 Tasmin Archer
 Joan Armatrading
 Stephanie Ashworth (Something for Kate)
 Aylin Aslim
 Nicole Atkins
 Melissa Auf der Maur (Auf der Maur, Hole)
 Caroline Azar (Fifth Column)

B

 Joan Baez
 Alice Bag (Bags, Castration Squad)
 Jessica Bailiff
 Honey Bane
 Sara Bareilles
 Niki Barr
 Courtney Barnett
 Edyta Bartosiewicz
 Becca (Stars in Stereo)
 Robin Beck
 Pat Benatar
 Miki Berenyi (Lush)
 Cia Berg (Whale)
 Elizabeth "Z" Berg (The Like)
 Marilina Bertoldi
 Sarah Bettens (K's Choice)
 Bif Naked
 Christina Billotte (Autoclave, Slant 6)
   Kat Bjelland (Babes in Toyland, Crunt, Katastrophy Wife)
 Björk (The Sugarcubes)
 Pauline Black (The Selecter)
 Porcelain Black (Porcelain and the Tramps)
 Jody Bleyle (Team Dresch)
 Beki Bondage (Vice Squad)
 Tracy Bonham
 Christina Booth (Magenta)
 Marie-Mai Bouchard
 Patti Boulaye
 Crystal Bowersox
 Carla Bozulich (Ethyl Meatplow, Geraldine Fibbers)
 Dale Bozzio (Missing Persons)
 Bonnie Bramlett
 Michelle Branch
 Laura Branigan
 Lynn Breedlove (Tribe 8)
 Edie Brickell (Edie Brickell & New Bohemians)
 Phoebe Bridgers (boygenius)
 Eva Briegel (Juli)
 Bette Bright (Deaf School)
 Maria Brink (In This Moment)
 Elkie Brooks
 Charmaine Brooks
 Meredith Brooks
 Pip Brown (Ladyhawke)
 Ruth Brown
 V V Brown
 Terri Brosius (Tribe)
 Carrie Brownstein (Excuse 17, Sleater-Kinney)
 Nanna Bryndís Hilmarsdóttir (Of Monsters and Men)
 Tahita Bulmer (New Young Pony Club)
 Anna Burley (The Killjoys)
 Megan Burns (Betty Curse)
 Shauna Burns
 Kate Bush
 Bilinda Butcher (My Bloody Valentine)

C

 Kathryn Calder (Immaculate Machine, The New Pornographers)
 Alexx Calise
 Lydia Canaan
 Dinah Cancer (45 Grave, Dinah Cancer and the Grave Robbers)
 Belinda Carlisle (The Go-Go's)
 Vanessa Carlton
 Kim Carnes
 Rachel Carns (The Need, King Cobra)
 Karen Carpenter (The Carpenters)
 Lisa Crystal Carver (Suckdog)
 Neko Case (The New Pornographers, Maow)
 Cassidy (Antigone Rising)
 Exene Cervenka (X, Original Sinners)
 Tracy Chapman
 Cher
 Toni Childs
 Jennifer Charles (Elysian Fields)
 Carah Faye Charnow (Shiny Toy Guns)
 Régine Chassagne (Arcade Fire)
 Alisa Childers (ZOEgirl)
 Melanie Chisholm (Melanie C)
 Agnieszka Chylińska (O.N.A.)
 Madonna Louise Ciccone (Madonna)
 Chantal Claret (Morningwood)
 Annie Clark (St. Vincent)
 Kelly Clarkson
 Daisy Coburn (Daisy Dares You)
 Lisa Coleman (Wendy & Lisa)
 Chi Coltrane
 Andrea Corr (The Corrs)
 Sharon Corr (The Corrs)
 Nikka Costa
 Chrissy Costanza (Against The Current)
 Josie Cotton
 Jayne County
 Sarah Cracknell (Saint Etienne)
 Beverley Craven
 Melora Creager (Rasputina)
 Sheryl Crow
 Allison Crowe
 Julia Cumming (Sunflower Bean)
 Alannah Currie (Thompson Twins, Babble (band))
 Cherie Currie (The Runaways, Cherie & Marie Currie)
 Marie Currie (Cherie & Marie Currie)
 Miley Cyrus

D

 Lisa Dalbello
 Brody Dalle (The Distillers)
 Danielle Dax
 Taylor Dayne
 Kim Deal (Pixies, The Breeders)
 Joanna Dean
 Lezlie Deane
 Carol Decker (T'Pau)
 Maria del Mar (National Velvet)
 Suze DeMarchi (Baby Animals)
 Tatiana DeMaria (TAT)
 Marina Diamandis (Marina and the Diamonds)
 Dido
 Ani DiFranco
 Dilana
 Beth Ditto (The Gossip)
 Melanie Doane
 Julie Doiron
 Lou Doillon
 Corinne Drewery (Swing Out Sister)
 Julie Driscoll
 Annette Ducharme
 Heather Duby
 Sherri DuPree (Eisley)

E

 Bobbie Eakes (Big Trouble)
 Tammy Ealom (Dressy Bessy, The Minders)
 Sheena Easton
 Andrea Echeverri (Aterciopelados)
 Aimee Echo (TheStart, Human Waste Project)
 Danielle Egnew
 Ella
 Mama Cass Elliot (The Mamas & the Papas)
 Sophie Ellis-Bextor (Theaudience)
 Elizabeth Elmore (The Reputation, Sarge)
 Liz Enthusiasm (Freezepop)
 Melissa Etheridge

F

 Siobhan Fahey (Bananarama, Shakespears Sister)
 Marianne Faithfull
 Etty Lau Farrell (Satellite Party)
 Leslie Feist (Broken Social Scene)
 Şebnem Ferah
 Sky Ferreira
 Melissa Ferrick
 Jennifer Finch (The Pandoras, L7, The Shocker)
 Orenda Fink (Azure Ray, Now It's Overhead, Art in Manila)
 Samantha Fish
 Colleen Fitzpatrick (Eve's Plum)
 Flor
 Ellen Foley
 Cassandra Ford (The Vincent Black Shadow)
 Frazey Ford
 Lita Ford (The Runaways, Lita Ford)

 Dia Frampton (Meg & Dia)
 Meg Frampton (Meg & Dia)
 Elizabeth Fraser (Cocteau Twins)
 Marie Fredriksson (Roxette)
 Eleanor Friedberger (The Fiery Furnaces)
 Justine Frischmann (Elastica)
 Dana Fuchs
 Miki Furukawa

G

 Diamanda Galas
 Janet Gardner (Vixen; mid-1980s)
 Suzi Gardner (L7)
 KatieJane Garside (Daisy Chainsaw, Queenadreena)
 Teri Gender Bender (Le Butcherettes)
 Anna Gerasimova
 Lisa Germano (Eels)
 Beth Gibbons (Portishead)
 Debbie Gibson
 Donna Godchaux
 Goldy Locks
 Holly Golightly (Thee Headcoatees)
 Kim Gordon (Sonic Youth, Free Kitten, Harry Crews)
 Lesley Gore
 Nina Gordon (Veruca Salt)
 Rachel Goswell (Slowdive, Mojave 3)
 Laura Jane Grace (Against Me!)
 Wynne Greenwood (Tracy + the Plastics)
 Jemma Griffiths (Jem)
 Clare Grogan (Altered Images)
 Lyndsey Gunnulfsen (PVRIS)

H

 Nina Hagen (The Nina Hagen Band)
 Danielle Haim (Haim)
 Emily Haines (Broken Social Scene, Emily Haines and the Soft Skeleton and Metric)
 Lzzy Hale (Halestorm)
 Toni Halliday (Curve)
 Bianca Halstead (Betty Blowtorch, Butt Trumpet)
 Ayumi Hamasaki
 Kay Hanley (Letters to Cleo)
 Kathleen Hanna (Bikini Kill, Le Tigre, The Julie Ruin)
 Lisa Hannigan
 Annie Hardy (Giant Drag)
 Sarah Harmer (The Saddletramps, Weeping Tile)
 Emmylou Harris
 Deborah Harry (Blondie)
 Beth Hart
 PJ Harvey
 Annie Haslam (Renaissance)
 Juliana Hatfield (Blake Babies, The Lemonheads)
 Charlotte Hatherley (Ash)
 Miho Hatori (Cibo Matto)
 Imogen Heap (Frou Frou)
 Christy Hemme 
 Nona Hendryx
 Jennifer Herrema (Royal Trux)
 Kristin Hersh (Throwing Muses, 50 Foot Wave)
 Susanna Hoffs (The Bangles)
 Ella Hooper (Killing Heidi)
 Horse
 Penelope Houston (The Avengers)
 Jenny Hoyston (Erase Errata)
 Laura Hubert (Leslie Spit Treeo)
 Anne-Marie Hurst (Skeletal Family, Ghost Dance)
 Chrissie Hynde (The Pretenders)

I

 Maja Ivarsson (The Sounds)
 Debora Iyall (Romeo Void)
 Laura Imbruglia
 Natalie Imbruglia
 Izïa

J

 Cindy Jackson (The Dollz)
 Kate Jackson (The Long Blondes)
 Wanda Jackson
 Wendy James (Transvision Vamp)
 Floor Jansen (Nightwish, Northward (band), After Forever)
 Taylor Jardine (We Are The In Crowd)
 Jane Jensen
 Jessicka (Jack Off Jill, Scarling.)
 Joan Jett (The Runaways, The Blackhearts, Evil Stig)
 Natalia Jiménez (La Quinta Estación)
 Martha Johnson (Martha and the Muffins)
 Marta Jandova (Die Happy)
 Molly Johnson (Alta Moda, Infidels)
 Taborah Johnson
 Gloria Jones
 Grace Jones
 Norah Jones
 Rickie Lee Jones
 Janis Joplin (Big Brother and the Holding Company, Kozmic Blues Band)
 Sass Jordan
 Milla Jovovich
 K. Juno

K

 Kaliopi
 Lena Katina
 Tomoko Kawase (Tommy Heavenly6)
 Lisa Kekaula (The Bellrays)
 Rose Kemp
 Joyce Kennedy (singer) (Mother's Finest)
 Kerri Kenney-Silver (Cake Like)
 Chaka Khan
 Natasha Khan (Bat for Lashes)
 Carole King
 Kaori Kishitani (Princess Princess)
 Stefanie Kloß (Silbermond)
 Chrissi Klug (Luttenberger*Klug)
 Jennifer Knapp
 Gladys Knight
 Theo Kogan (Theo & the Skyscrapers, Lunachicks)
 Ash Koley
 Alexis Krauss (Sleigh Bells)
 Chantal Kreviazuk
 Sonja Kristina (Curved Air)
 Jan Kuehnemund (Vixen; early 1970s)
 Sierra Kusterbeck (VersaEmerge)

L

 Patti LaBelle
 Lachi
 Martha Ladly (Martha and the Muffins, The Associates)
 LaFee
 Shona Laing
 Nomy Lamm
 Anita Lane
 Lana Lane
 Storm Large
 Liz Larin
 Cyndi Lauper
 Lindsay Lohan
 Dyanna Lauren (Thousand Year Itch)
 Lauren Laverne (Kenickie)
 Avril Lavigne
 Noelle LeBlanc (Damone)
 Jen Ledger (Skillet (band))
 Brenda Lee

 Rita Lee (Os Mutantes)
 Sook-Yin Lee (Bob's Your Uncle)
 Annie Lennox (Eurythmics)
 Adrianne Leon
 Katrina Leskanich (Katrina and the Waves)
 Jenny Lewis (Rilo Kiley, Jenny Lewis and The Watson Twins)
 Juliette Lewis (Juliette and the Licks)
 Susanne Lewis (Hail, Thinking Plague)
 Little Annie
 Little Eva
 Cristina Llanos (Dover)
 Lisa Lobsinger (Broken Social Scene, Reverie Sound Revue)
 Lisa Loeb
 Lora Logic (X-Ray Spex, Essential Logic, Red Krayola)
 Mary Lou Lord
 Ruth Lorenzo
 Inger Lorre (The Nymphs)
 Bonnie Lou
 Sara Lov (Devics)
 Courtney Love (Hole)
 Darlene Love
 Lovefoxxx (CSS)
 Lene Lovich
 Pearl Lowe (Powder)
 Lulu
 Lydia Lunch (Teenage Jesus and the Jerks, Beirut Slump, 8-Eyed Spy, Harry Crews)
 Michelle Luttenberger (Luttenberger*Klug)
 Annabella Lwin (Bow Wow Wow)

M

 

 Mariqueen Maandig (How To Destroy Angels)
 Kirsty MacColl
 Amy Macdonald
 Maggie MacDonald (Republic of Safety, Kids on TV, Barcelona Pavilion)
 Lois Maffeo
 Leslie Mah (Anti-Scrunti Faction)
 Kazu Makino (Blonde Redhead)
 Michelle Malone
 Aimee Mann ('Til Tuesday)
 Barbara Manning
 Shirley Manson (Garbage, Goodbye Mr Mackenzie, Angelfish)
April March
 Ida Maria
 Krystal Meyers
 Marjo
 Chan Marshall (Cat Power)
 Dorothy Martin (Dorothy)
 Janis Martin
 Carolyne Mas
 Ana Matronic (Scissor Sisters)
 Cerys Matthews (Catatonia)
 Denise McCann (Headpins)
 Jenna McDougall (Tonight Alive)
 Elizabeth McGrath (Miss Derringer)
 Frances McKee
 Maria McKee
 Sarah McLeod (The Superjesus)
 Sarah McLachlan
 Holly McNarland
 Sylvia McNeill
 Christine McVie (Fleetwood Mac)
 Fleming McWilliams (Fleming and John)
 Wendy Melvoin (Wendy & Lisa)
 Natalie Merchant (10,000 Maniacs)
 Olivia Merilahti (The Dø)
 Tift Merritt
 Riki Michele
 Bette Midler
 Amy Millan (Stars, Broken Social Scene)
 June Millington (Fanny)
 Darby Mills (Headpins)
 Kylie Minogue
 Rachel Minton (Zolof the Rock & Roll Destroyer)
 Holly Miranda (The Jealous Girlfriends)
 Joni Mitchell
 Taylor Momsen (The Pretty Reckless)
 Betty Moon
 Alecia Beth Moore (P!nk)
 Rebecca Moore
 Lisa Moorish
 Alanis Morissette
 Patricia Morrison (Bags, Legal Weapon, The Gun Club, The Sisterhood, The Damned)
 Lisa Moorish

 Dorothy Moskowitz (The United States of America)
 Alison Mosshart (Discount, The Kills, The Dead Weather)
 Alison Moyet (Yazoo)
 Lennon Murphy
 Pauline Murray (Penetration)
 Billie Myers
 Alannah Myles

N

 Mika Nakashima

 Michie Nakatani (Shonen Knife)
 Terra Naomi
 Johnette Napolitano (Concrete Blonde)
 Leigh Bingham Nash (Sixpence None the Richer)
 Sandra Nasic (Guano Apes)
 Ednita Nazario
 Nena
 Anastacia Newkirk (Anastacia)
 Juice Newton
 Olivia Newton-John
 Stevie Nicks (Fleetwood Mac)
 Nico
 Ninja (The Go! Team)
 Sarah Nixey (Black Box Recorder)
 Stina Nordenstam
 Tone Norum
 Kasia Nosowska (Hey)
 Heather Nova
 Terri Nunn (Berlin)
 Laura Nyro

O

 Orianthi
 Eva O (Christian Death)
 Karen Orzolek (Yeah Yeah Yeahs)
 Hazel O'Connor
 Sinéad O'Connor
 Olivia
 Anette Olzon (Nightwish, Alyson Avenue, The Dark Element)
 Yoko Ono (The Plastic Ono Band)
 Dolores O'Riordan (The Cranberries)
 Beth Orton
 Joan Osborne

P

 Amanda Palmer (The Dresden Dolls)
 Vanessa Paradis
 Dolly Parton
 Annette Peacock
 Jemina Pearl (Be Your Own Pet)
 Laura Pergolizzi (LP)
 Katy Perry
 Linda Perry (4 Non Blondes)
 Nina Persson (The Cardigans, Sparklehorse, A Camp)
 Vicki Peterson (The Bangles)
 Vanessa Petruo
 Kembra Pfahler (The Voluptuous Horror of Karen Black)
 Liz Phair
 Britta Phillips (Luna)
 Michelle Phillips (The Mamas & the Papas)
 Phranc (Nervous Gender, Catholic Discipline)
 Kate Pierson (The B-52's)
 Pitty
 Poe
 Tamala Poljak (Longstocking)
 Carole Pope (Rough Trade)
 Cassadee Pope (Hey Monday)
 Louise Post (Veruca Salt)
 Grace Potter (Grace Potter and the Nocturnals)
 Cat Power
 Preslava
 Lisa Marie Presley
 Anne Preven
 Lindsay Price

Q

 Suzi Quatro
 Sara Quin (Tegan and Sara)
 Tegan Quin (Tegan and Sara)
 Diana Quinn (Tru Fax and the Insaniacs, Honky Tonk Confidential, The Fabulettes)
 Stacey Q

R

 Stefy Rae (Stefy)
 Rainey
 Bonnie Raitt
 Mary Ramsey (10,000 Maniacs, John & Mary)
 Genya Ravan (The Escorts, Goldie & the Gingerbreads, Ten Wheel Drive)
 Marion Raven
 Amy Ray (Indigo Girls)
 Julianne Regan (All About Eve)
 Jane Relf (Renaissance)
 Manda Rin (Bis)
 Catherine Ringer (Les Rita Mitsouko)
 Janet Robin
 The Roches
 Katy Rose
 Patti Rothberg
 Linda Ronstadt
 Tina Root (Switchblade Symphony, Tre Lux)
 Amanda Rootes (Fluffy)
 Holly Ross (Angelica)
 Ellie Rowsell (Wolf Alice)
 Emma Ruth Rundle (Marriages and Red Sparowes)
 Serena Ryder

S

 Lætitia Sadier (Stereolab)
 Santi White (Stage name Santigold)
 Ashlee Simpson
 Jenna Sanz-Agero (Vixen)
 Saffron (Republica)
 Svetlana Surganova
 Emily Saliers (Indigo Girls)
 Greta Salpeter (The Hush Sound)
 Hope Sandoval (Mazzy Star, Hope Sandoval & the Warm Inventions)
 Cristina Scabbia (Lacuna Coil)
 Simi Sernaker (Suffrajett)
 Moon Shadow (as Goldy Locks 
 Shakira Isabel Mebark Ripoll (Shakira) 
 Nancy Shanks (Vixen; early 1970s)
 Sarah Shannon (Velocity Girl)
 Kim Shattuck (The Muffs, The Pandoras)
 Ringo Sheena (Tokyo Jihen)
 Davetta Sherwood
 Shery
 Madigan Shive (Tattle Tale, Bonfire Madigan)
 Ana da Silva (The Raincoats)
 Jane Siberry (AKA Issa)
 Jenny Simmons (Addison Road)
 Simone Simons
 Juliet Simms (Automatic Loveletter)
 Carly Simon
 Nina Simone
 Nancy Sinatra
 Siouxsie Sioux (Siouxsie and the Banshees, The Creatures)
 Skin (Skunk Anansie)
 Grace Slick (Jefferson Airplane, Jefferson Starship, Starship)
 Tara Slone (Joydrop)
 Jen Smith (Dub Narcotic Sound System)
 Patti Smith
 Shawnee Smith
 Carly Smithson (We Are the Fallen)
 Patty Smyth (Scandal)
 Azalia Snail
 Jill Sobule
 Soko
 Marla Sokoloff (Smitten)
 Pepper Somerset (My Life With The Thrill Kill Kult)
 Louisa Rachel Solomon (The Shondes)
 Donita Sparks (L7)
 Ronnie Spector (The Ronettes)
 Regina Spektor
 Pamela Spence
 Sharleen Spiteri (Texas)
 Adalita Srsen (Magic Dirt)
 Becky Stark (Lavender Diamond)
 Alison Statton (Young Marble Giants, Weekend)
 Gwen Stefani (No Doubt)
 Juanita Stein (Howling Bells)
 Marnie Stern
 Laura Stoica
 Linda Strawberry
 Re Styles (The Tubes)
 Poly Styrene (X-Ray Spex)
 Alison Sudol (A Fine Frenzy)
 Lacey Sturm (Flyleaf)
 Rachel Sweet
 Skye Sweetnam

T

 Koko Taylor
 Maria Taylor (Azure Ray, Now It's Overhead)
 Susan Tedeschi
 Özlem Tekin
 Keiko Terada (Show-Ya)
 Texas Terri
 Tanita Tikaram
 Sister Rosetta Tharpe
 Kristy Thirsk (Delerium, Rose Chronicles)
 Sandi Thom
 Irma Thomas
 Linda Thompson
 Tracey Thorn (Everything but the Girl)
 Tiffany
 Mary Timony (Helium, Autoclave, Wild Flag)
 Martina Topley-Bird
 Emilíana Torrini
 Rachel Trachtenburg (Trachtenburg Family Slideshow Players)
 Sisely Treasure (Shiny Toy Guns)
 Lindsey Troy (Deap Vally)
 Jen Trynin
 Anna Tsuchiya
 Corin Tucker (Sleater-Kinney)
 KT Tunstall
 Tina Turner
 Tarja Turunen 
 Bonnie Tyler
 Judie Tzuke

U

 Ari Up (The Slits, New Age Steppers)
Carrie Underwood

V

 Tobi Vail (Bikini Kill)
 Tomiko Van (Do As Infinity)
 Marijne van der Vlugt (Salad, Cowboy Racer)
 Anneke van Giersbergen (The Gathering)
 Tara VanFlower (Lycia)
 Cherry Vanilla
 Suzanne Vega
 Mariska Veres (Shocking Blue)
 Holly Beth Vincent (Holly and the Italians)
 Julia Volkova

W

 Mary Weiss (The Shangri-Las)
 Florence Welch (Florence and the Machine) 
 Louise Wener (Sleeper)
 Silje Wergeland (The Gathering, Octavia Sperati)
 Tina Weymouth (Talking Heads, Tom Tom Club)
 Harriet Wheeler (The Sundays)
 Emily Jane White
 Katie White (The Ting Tings)
 Meg White (The White Stripes)
 Jane Wiedlin (The Go-Go's)
 Toyah Willcox
 Kim Wilde
 Tess Wiley (Sixpence None the Richer)
 Hayley Williams (Paramore)
 Lucinda Williams
 Wendy O. Williams (Plasmatics)
 Ann Wilson (Heart)
 Cindy Wilson (The B-52's)
 Kaia Wilson (Adickdid, Team Dresch, The Butchies)
 Nancy Wilson (Heart)
 Karin Wistrand (Lolita Pop)
 Whitney Wolanin
 Allison Wolfe (Bratmobile, Partyline)
 Jen Wood (The Postal Service, Tattle Tale)
 Holly Woods (Toronto)
 D'arcy Wretzky (The Smashing Pumpkins)
 Shannon Wright

Y

 Naoko Yamano (Shonen Knife)
 Rachael Yamagata
 Kim Yoon-ah (Jaurim)
 Ella Yelich-O'Connor (Lorde)
 Astrid Young

Z

 Pia Zadora
 Mary Lu Zahalan
 Mia Zapata (The Gits)
 Thalia Zedek (Live Skull)
 Zemfira
 Annette Zilinskas (The Bangles)
 Zola Jesus

See also

 Lead vocalist
 List of female heavy metal singers

References

Sources

 Zeiss, Mary S.; et al. Encyclopedia of Women in Today's World. Sage Publications, Inc. 
 Thomson Liz; et al. New Women in Rock. Omnibus Press 1982. 

 
rock
Rock singers